Aistulf (also Ahistulf, Aistulfus, Haistulfus, Astolf etc.; ; died December 756) was the Duke of Friuli from 744, King of the Lombards from 749, and Duke of Spoleto from 751. His reign was characterized by ruthless and ambitious efforts to conquer Roman territory to the extent that in the Liber Pontificalis, he is described as a "shameless" Lombard given to "pernicious savagery" and cruelty.

Biography
Aistulf was born as the son of Duke Pemmo of Friuli and his wife Ratperga.

After his brother Ratchis became king, Aistulf succeeded him as Duke of Friuli and later succeeded him as king, when Ratchis was forced to abdicate the throne. Ratchis entered a monastery thereafter. While Ratchis had been more tolerant with the Roman element of the Italian population, Aistulf followed a more aggressive policy of expansion and raids against the Papal States and the Eastern Roman exarchate of Ravenna. In 750, Aistulf captured Ravenna and all the provinces subject to the Exarchate, even declaring himself king of the Romans. He also held court in the former palace of the Exarch, where historian Peter Brown asserts, that as a good western Catholic, Aistulf likely offered gifts "on the altar of San Vitale." With the Lombard king close, Rome was under threat and if the city and its Patriarch were to survive, Brown adds, "they had to look for new protectors." Recognizing the religious authority of Pope Stephen II, Aistulf offered peace to the pontiff but under Lombard hegemony. In the late spring or summer 751, Aistulf placed Spoleto under his direct control without naming a replacement duke.

Having declared himself the new king of the Romans, Aistulf believed that the empire's former supremacy in Italy was now extinct; as a result, the Roman Pope Stephen was unable to exercise the same pastoral diplomacy that his predecessor, Pope Zachary, had over both Luitprand and Ratchis. At Ravenna, Aistulf demanded tribute from the Roman duchy itself, straining papal coffers and greatly worrying Pope Stephen enough that he began negotiations with the Franks.

Aistulf's demands were causing consternation in Rome. In 753, Pope Stephen II crossed the Alps and wintered with the Franks, again petitioning them for assistance against Aistulf's Lombards. Returning from a summer campaign against the Saxons, the Frankish leader, Pepin the Short, learned that the pontiff—accompanied by a large following and bearing gifts—was traveling north to meet with him. While Pope Stephen's arrival in Francia was noteworthy, it was near concomitant with that of Pepin's brother, Carloman, who had incidentally come to Francia under pressure from the Lombard king, Aistulf, to explicitly dissuade Pepin from entering Italy.

Carloman's effort to deter his brother from pursuing Aistulf proved unsuccessful and Pepin, who was accompanied by Pope Stephen, left Francia for Italy during the summer of 754; the ailing Carloman joined them on their journey but died on the way. Pope Stephen had further ingratiated Pepin to his cause by bestowing the title "Patrician of the Romans" onto him and his son, which proved sufficient to elicit Frankish aide and opposition to Aistulf's claims of sovereignty over the Roman empire. Pepin then sent demands to Aistulf for him submit to the patrimony of St. Peter, which meant relinquishing his gains; the Lombard king refused Pepin's demands, thus beginning a Frankish military incursion into Italy.

In the spring of 755, the newly anointed Pepin crossed the Alps at the head of his army, putting the Lombards to flight and forcing Aistulf's hand in returning papal lands and those belonging to the wider Roman res publica that he had occupied. While a treaty was signed between Aistulf and Pepin after the Franks laid siege to Pavia, which included the return of Roman lands and a lasting peace, Aistulf was not long in breaking the treaty once Pepin left Italy. After the Frankish army was back across the Alps, Aistulf besieged Rome again in 756, engendering another plea from the papacy. It read:

I, the Apostle Peter...who adopted you as my sons...and who chose you Franks above all other peoples...I hereby urge and exhort you...to protect my flock...defend Rome, and your brothers the Romans, from the heinous Lombards!...Come, come, in the name of the one living and true God, I beseech you, come and help before the spring of life from which you drink and in which you are reborn dries up, before the last spark of the sacred flame which illuminates you dies out, and before your spiritual mother, God’s holy Church...is desecrated."

Once he heard the anxious pleas from the pope, Pepin marched his Frankish army back into Italy, again defeated the Lombards and forced Aistulf to surrender, but this time the Franks directly supervised the land returns. In the midst of these negotiations, a Byzantine ambassador was sent to Pepin with imperial claims over the liberated provinces—part of an attempt to substitute Lombard suzerainty for Byzantine domination—but Pepin refused such offers, allowing the Roman West to retain some autonomy as the Frankish king thought only of the Papacy. Meanwhile, Pepin imposed an annual tribute be paid by the Lombards to the Franks, which historian Paolo Delogu labels nothing less than "political subjection." Despite this blow to Aistulf's prestige, the Lombard kingdom remained more or less intact and as Delogu observes, "the political and military alliance between the Franks and the papacy was not solid enough to allow the latter to act very effectively against the Lombards." When Aistulf died in 756—killed during a hunting accident—his succession was not without controversy when the ex-king Ratchis emerged from his monastery with the intention to reascend to the throne, but the ambitious Desiderius (duke of Tuscany), gained both Frankish and papal support and replaced Aistulf as king of the Lombards in March 757. 

Aistulf was buried in the church of San Marino in Pavia, which he founded.

References

Informational notes

Citations

Bibliography

Further reading
Jörg Jarnut, Storia dei Longobardi, Turin, Einaudi, 2002. 
Sergio Rovagnati, I Longobardi, Milan, Xenia, 2003. 
Ottorino Bertolini (1892-1977), Astolfo, pp. 246/247

External links 

|-

756 deaths
8th-century Lombard monarchs
Dukes of Friuli
8th-century dukes of Spoleto
Lombard warriors
Year of birth unknown
Deaths by horse-riding accident in Italy